Planodes stratus is a species of beetle in the family Cerambycidae. It was described by Heller in 1900. It is known from Sulawesi.

References

stratus
Beetles described in 1900